David Woo is the CEO of David Woo Unbound, a global forum devoted to the promotion of fact-based debates about markets, politics, and economics. Woo was previously the Head of Global Interest Rates, Foreign Exchange, Emerging Market Fixed Income & Economics Research at Bank of America, where he researched the world financial markets. Woo is known for his contrarian calls on the 2016 United States elections, the 2015 devaluation of the renminbi, Bitcoin, and the future of the Euro. He was voted as one of the twelve smartest people on Wall Street in 2013 by Business Insider.

The 2016 US election 
In September 2016, Woo said "markets were failing to adequately price in the probability of a Trump win" and predicted that "if Trump won, it would bring about a stronger dollar and higher rates thanks to fiscal stimulus".

The 2015 renminbi devaluation 
In April 2015, Woo argued that the renminbi was set to fall because "China cannot allow for looser capital flows while maintaining its monetary policy targets, which include limiting the yuan's moves against the US dollar. In June 2015, Woo called the Chinese equity rally the "world’s largest bubble since dot-com boom of the late 1990s" and predicted that Chinese shares "may drop as much as 30%", and creating a "knock-on effect on the whole world economy." After the August 2015 renminbi devaluation, Woo predicted the renminbi could decline further by as much as 10% against the dollar in 2016. Woo also argued that this would have global repercussions, including a "shallower Fed cycle."

Bitcoin 
In December 2013, Woo argued that Bitcoin "can become a major means of payment for e-commerce and may emerge as a serious competitor to traditional money transfer providers", an opinion that Joe Weisenthal said "represents a top-fligh kappat mind at a major financial institution assessing it in a serious way, and coming to the conclusion that it could be the real deal." However, Woo put the upper bound of Bitcoin’s fair value at $1300, stating that "Bitcoin is highly volatile, the result of speculation activities, and that's hindering its general acceptance as a form of payment."

The 2012 European debt crisis 
In July 2012, in a cost-benefit analysis of whether individual members of the Eurozone should stay with the euro, David Woo and Athanasios Vamvakidis argued that “Italy and Ireland emerge as the countries with the greatest incentive to exit.” They concluded that a much weaker euro was necessary to reduce the incentive of any country to exit.

US energy independence and the dollar 
In March 2013, Woo argued that "rising U.S. crude oil and natural gas production will likely lift the American greenback against major currencies" by shrinking the US current account deficit, boosting investment and reducing the correlation between the dollar and oil prices.

References

External links 
Bank of America: Downside risk for Canadian dollar, featuring David Woo by The Globe and Mail

Columbia Graduate School of Arts and Sciences alumni
Market researchers
Tufts University School of Arts and Sciences alumni
American chief executives
Living people
Year of birth missing (living people)